Sarcocapnos enneaphylla is a species of flowering plant in the family Papaveraceae. It is native to southwestern Europe and northern Africa. It grows in rocks and crevices of escarpments, usually in limestone cliffs.

Description

The sarcocapnos enneaphylla is a more or less creeping perennial plant. It has a woody base and flexible caespitose stems. The leaves are long-stalked and compound, with rounded oval segments -- almost heart-shaped -- with a pointed apex. Its flowers are white or yellowish, and purple at the end. The outer petals are much longer and divided into two lobes. The upper petal is provided with a short spur inflated at the apex. The ovaries have two ovules. The fruit is elongated and compressed. The plant flowers from winter to summer.

References

Fumarioideae
Flora of Spain